The Gum River is a river in Madang Province, Papua New Guinea.

The Gum languages are spoken in the area.

See also
List of rivers of Papua New Guinea
Gum River languages

References

Rivers of Papua New Guinea